Leona Alleslev-Krofchak (born March 16, 1968) is a Canadian politician and former military officer who served as the member of Parliament (MP) for Aurora—Oak Ridges—Richmond Hill. She was elected as a Liberal in the 2015 federal election, and crossed the floor to join the Conservative Party in 2018, citing disagreements with the Liberal government over their handling of economic and foreign affairs. On October 21, 2019, she was re-elected as a Conservative. Alleslev was defeated in the 2021 federal election.

Alleslev was a candidate in the 2022 Conservative leadership election.

Political career

Member of Parliament 
Alleslev was elected as a member of the Liberal Party of Canada in the 2015 federal election, in the riding of Aurora—Oak Ridges—Richmond Hill. She crossed the floor to join the Conservative Party in September 2018.

After being re-elected as a Conservative following the 2019 election, Andrew Scheer appointed Alleslev as the deputy Opposition leader and deputy Conservative leader.

On July 12, 2020, Alleslev announced that she was stepping down as Deputy Leader. Alleslev expressed her interest in engaging in one of the leadership campaigns in the 2020 leadership race. On July 13, 2020, she endorsed Peter MacKay to be the next Conservative leader. Peter MacKay's campaign claims it did not cut a deal with her to get her endorsement and Alleslev stated that "My loyalty can’t be bought, it must be earned". She was succeeded as deputy leader by Candice Bergen.

2022 Conservative leadership election 
On March 24, 2022, Alleslev announced that she would be contesting the leadership election of the Conservative Party.
On April 29, she withdrew from the contest after being unable to come up with the $300,000 registration fee.

Electoral record

References 

1968 births
Living people
Liberal Party of Canada MPs
Conservative Party of Canada MPs
Members of the House of Commons of Canada from Ontario
Women members of the House of Commons of Canada
People from Richmond Hill, Ontario
Royal Canadian Air Force officers
Women in Ontario politics
Canadian female military personnel
21st-century Canadian politicians
21st-century Canadian women politicians
Royal Military College of Canada alumni
Women deputy opposition leaders
Deputy opposition leaders